W.R. Mead may refer to:
 Walter Russell Mead (1952 – ), an American academic
 William Rutherford Mead (1846 – 1928), an American architect